King Khan is a 2011 Dhallywood action and romance film written and directed by  Mohammad Hossain Jaimy, and starring Shakib Khan in the lead roles. It also features Apu Biswas, Mimo, Misha Sawdagor, Ujjal, Sucharita, Kabila, Sadek Bachchu, Kazi Hayat, and Maruf Akib in supporting roles.

Cast
 Shakib Khan as King Khan/Rakesh
 Apu Biswas
 Mimo
 Misha Sawdagor - King Khan (fake)
 Ujjal
 Sucharita
 Kabila
 Sadek Bachchu
 Kazi Hayat
 Maruf Akib

Accolades
 Meril Prothom Alo Award 2011
Winner: Best Actor Shakib Khan
 Uro-CJFB Performance Award 2011
Winner: Best Actor Shakib Khan

References

External links
 

2011 films
2011 action films
2011 romantic drama films
Bengali-language Bangladeshi films
Bangladeshi action films
Bangladeshi romantic drama films
Films scored by Ali Akram Shuvo
2010s Bengali-language films